The Acadia Divinity College (ADC) is Baptist theological institute located in Wolfville, Nova Scotia, Canada. It is affiliated with the Canadian Baptists of Atlantic Canada. It is governed by a board of trustees with members appointed by the Convention and the Board of Governors of Acadia University. The college is also the Faculty of Theology of Acadia University. 

ADC shares facilities with Acadia University; the college's library is part of the university's 800,000 volume Vaughan Memorial Library collection.  Also hosted at Acadia University are the Esther Clark Wright Archives, which includes an extensive collection of material relating to the Canadian Baptists of Atlantic Canada (CBAC).

History
As early as 1830, Baptists in Nova Scotia, Canada established a "department of pious scholars" at Horton Academy in Wolfville (founded 1828) for ministerial training. A decade later, Baptist Leaders resolved to establish a Baptist College, an institution of higher learning where all people would be free to work and study, regardless of religious persuasion.  The decision to establish Queen's College, which would become Acadia University, was formally approved by the Nova Scotia Baptist Education Society on November 15, 1838.  Preparation for ministry was carried on under various formats until the School of Theology was put on a more formal footing in 1923.

After Acadia University was reorganized in 1966, the Baptists of Atlantic Canada began to operate the School of Theology under the name Acadia Divinity College, and on June 1, 1968, the Acadia Divinity College was established by an act of the Nova Scotia Legislature.

Centres of Excellence at Acadia Divinity College

Acadia Centre for Baptist and Anabaptist Studies (ACBAS) 
Established by Acadia Divinity College in cooperation with the Vaughan Memorial Library of Acadia University in April 1991, encourages and facilitates studies in the fields of Baptist and Anabaptist history and thought, especially in the Atlantic region of Canada.

Charles J. Taylor Centre for Chaplaincy and Spiritual Care 
Fosters and promotes clinical and theological excellence in the area of Pastoral Care through personal growth, the building of professional capacities and rigorous theological reflection. The Taylor Centre trains and prepares men and women for pastoral ministry in specialized forms, including hospital chaplaincy, military chaplaincy, prison chaplaincy, and a variety of other caring professions, for which care for the Spirit is of primary importance.

Andrew D. MacRae Centre for Christian Faith and Culture 
Provides a forum for helping students and the wider church engage with people and issues in meaningful, thoughtful, relevant, and transformative ways - by collecting and distributing resources, offering courses and programs, and as a research hub.

Teaching sites

Wolfville, Nova Scotia 
Students can complete any bachelor's, master's, or doctoral degree or program part-time or full-time at ADC's main teaching site located on the campus of Acadia University in Wolfville. All courses required for all degrees are offered on a rotating basis over a two- or three-year period in a variety of teaching formats including once weekly, intensive weeks, and on weekends. All courses are taught in a hybrid formatting allowing students to attend classes from anywhere in the world.

Continuing education 
The college seeks to encourage and equip leaders throughout their lifetime of ministry through two annual lectureships:

Simpson Lectures 
Mr. Gerald K. Simpson of Fairhaven, Deer Island, New Brunswick, established an endowment in 1979 to finance an annual series of lectures on the practice of ministry prepared primarily for students, pastors, and spouses. The lecturers are outstanding persons in ministry who focus on the role of the minister as both preacher and pastor. This lectureship has welcomed many distinguished preachers including John N. Gladstone, Haddon W. Robinson, Alan Sell, and Gardner Taylor.

Hayward Lectures 
Established and endowed in 1964 by Mrs. C. C. Hayward of Wolfville, the Hayward Lectures provide academic dialogue in order to stimulate critical engagement and reflection on key and emerging ideas in Church History, Christian Theology, and Biblical Studies.

The Hayward Lectures advances its vision by inviting world-class scholars to Acadia in the aforementioned disciplines to address the community each October on their freshest work and emerging or disruptive ideas in the formats of lecture, conversation, and writing.

Affiliations
The College is affiliated with the Canadian Baptists of Atlantic Canada. 

The Acadia University awards all of the Acadia Divinity College degrees, upon recommendation from the ADC Senate and the Senate of Acadia University. The graduate degrees are accredited by the Association for Biblical Higher Education and the Association of Theological Schools in the United States and Canada.

Endowed academic chairs 
Endowed academic (teaching) chairs are established to ensure that permanent funding is available to the college to meet the costs of a professor's salary in a given discipline. Eleven chairs have been established at ADC covering a variety of disciplines.
 Thomas James Armstrong Memorial Professorship of Practical Theology and Church History
 Dr. Millard R. Cherry Chair of Christian Thought and Ethics 
 Sheldon and Marjorie Fountain Chair of Evangelism  and Mission
 John Gladstone Chair in Preaching and Worship
 Abner J. Langley and Harold L. Mitton Chair of Church Leadership
 William and Virginia Leach Chair of Pastoral Psychology
 Thomas B. McDormand, Charles J. Taylor, and Dennis M. Veinotte Chair of Pastoral Care and Counselling
 Hannah Maria Norris Chair in Christian Missions and Social Issues
 Rev. Dr. William and Dr. Pearleen Oliver Chair of Community Leadership and Social Justice
 Payzant Chair of Biblical Studies
 Stevens-Fenerty Chair of Urban Ministry and Church Growth

See also

List of evangelical seminaries and theological colleges
Association of Theological Schools in the United States and Canada
Canadian Baptists of Atlantic Canada (CBAC)
Canadian Baptist Ministries
Acadia University

References

External links
Acadia Divinity College Official site
Convention of Atlantic Baptist Churches

Divinity College
Educational institutions established in 1968
Baptist seminaries and theological colleges in Canada